Chiperceni is a commune in Orhei District, Moldova. It is composed of three villages: Andreevca, Chiperceni and Voroteț.

Notable people
 Ilarion Buiuc

References

Communes of Orhei District
Orgeyevsky Uyezd